Nick Allen is an American politician who is a member of the Maryland House of Delegates for District 8 in Baltimore County, Maryland.

Background
Allen graduated from Mount Saint Joseph High School in 2007 and attended the United States Military Academy, where he earned a Bachelor of Arts degree in arts, philosophy, and literature in 2011. He served as a platoon leader for the 7th Cavalry Regiment from 2013 to 2014, and for the 9th Field Artillery Regiment in 2014.

In the legislature
Allen was sworn into the Maryland House of Delegates on January 11, 2023, with the start of the Maryland General Assembly's 445th legislative session. He is a member of the House Environment and Transportation Committee.

Electoral history

References

External links
 

21st-century American politicians
Living people
Military personnel from Maryland
United States Military Academy alumni
Year of birth uncertain
Democratic Party members of the Maryland House of Delegates
Year of birth missing (living people)